Atractus nasutus is a species of snake in the family Colubridae. The species can be found in Colombia.

References 

Atractus
Reptiles of Colombia
Endemic fauna of Colombia
Snakes of South America
Reptiles described in 2005